Vally Sathyabhama (born 14 May 1964) is a former Indian long-distance runner who currently holds the Indian national record in the marathon. She set the record with a time of 2:38:10 on 21 December 1995 in Chennai.

In 1991, she won the gold medal for 10,000 metres in the All-India Open National Championships. In the same year, she repeated her performance by winning the gold in 10,000 m in the All-India Inter-State Championships

References

External links

Living people
1964 births
Place of birth missing (living people)
Indian female marathon runners
Indian female long-distance runners
20th-century Indian women
20th-century Indian people